Humberlito Borges Teixeira or simply Borges (born October 5, 1980 in Salvador), is a Brazilian retired footballer who played as a striker.

Career

Club career

União São João
Before coming to União São João started by clubs without much expression. He played extremely well, showing his football for the whole of Brazil, so he was hired by Paraná.

Jataiense
Borges had a brief spell in Jataiense, he pointed out a lot in Campeonato Goiano.

Vegalta Sendai
In 2006 Borges attracted the attention of Japanese team Vegalta Sendai. Whilst playing for them, he was top scorer in the J2 League for 2006.

São Paulo
After his success in Japan, Borges was hired by São Paulo in 2007. In the Campeonato Brasileiro Série A that year, he was one of three top scorers of São Paulo with 7 goals. The other two were Dagoberto and goalkeeper Rogerio Ceni. Sao Paulo won the Brazilian championship for the second year running.

In 2008, Borges scored 10 goals in the championship for São Paulo who won for the third year in a row. Borges scored five goals less than the top striker of the year, Alex Mineiro of Palmeiras.

On November 8, Borges scored his first hat-trick in São Paulo's shirt. He achieved this in a match against Portugal at the Estádio do Canindé. This season, he scored 16 goals in the Campeonato Brasileiro Série A.

In 2009, Borges was the top scorer of São Paulo in the Copa Libertadores.

Grêmio
The player was presented by the Guild on January 5, 2010 along with Leandro, William and Maurice. The player has trained with the group and traveled with the delegation towards pre-season in the city of Bento Gonçalves, Rio Grande do Sul in the mountains.
Debuted for Gremio in the first round of the 2010 Campeonato Gaúcho in the game against Pelotas, Estádio Boca do Lobo in Pelotas. It began as the holder of the attack, along with former teammate Leandro Sao Paulo. The game ended 3-2 to the Guild, and Borges scored the tie of the tricolor when the match was 2-1 to Pelotas. The other goals were Jonas (penalty) and Maylson.

At the premiere of Gremio in Brazil Cup 2010, against the Araguaia Atlético Clube, Borges scored two goals, being decisive for the classification of the Guild to advance the next phase.
His first goal in Grenal occurred on April 25, 2010, valid for the 1st game of the finals of the Gaucho, 2010. He has played a Grenal for Gremio in the first round of the Cup Fernando Carvalho (1st round of the Gaucho ) but did not score. His goal was the second victory in the Tri 2-0 at Estádio Beira-Rio in Porto Alegre.

Santos
On May 23, 2011, the boards of Santos and Gremio confirmed the transfer of the striker to the team from São Paulo. In his smash debut, Borges scored two goals in a 3-1 victory over Avai. And he scored a goal late in the game between  Cruzeiro and Santos, which was won by a score of 1-0.

Having not played for Gremio played the finals of the Libertadores (Santos left the champion), but remained well in the matches for the national championship, with the absolute owner Santos 9 shirt. He was now Brasileirão top scorer with 23 goals in 29 games reaching the mark of Serginho Chulapa, which lasted 28 years (since 1983). He came to be compared with the Cameroonian striker Samuel Eto'o.

Cruzeiro
On his debut for Cruzeiro, Borges scored against his previous club, Santos in a competitive game in the Brasil Série A.

Internatıonal Career
As reward for his great form at Santos in 2011 as top scorer in the Campeonato Brasileiro Série A, Borges was called up on September 22, 2011 for the second game against Argentina in the Superclásico, South American's greatest football grudge match.

Club statistics

Honours

Club
São Paulo
Campeonato Brasileiro Série A: 2007, 2008

Grêmio
Campeonato Gaúcho:  2010SantosCampeonato Paulista: 2012CruzeiroCampeonato Brasileiro Série A: 2013, 2014
Campeonato Mineiro: 2014América MineiroCampeonato Mineiro: 2016

InternationalBrazil'''
 Superclásico de las Américas: 2011

Individual
J2 League Top scorer: 2006
Campeonato Brasileiro Série A Top scorer: 2011

References

External links
 
 

1980 births
Living people
Sportspeople from Salvador, Bahia
Association football forwards
Brazilian footballers
Brazilian expatriate footballers
Associação Atlética Internacional (Bebedouro) players
Associação Desportiva São Caetano players
Paysandu Sport Club players
União São João Esporte Clube players
Paraná Clube players
Vegalta Sendai players
São Paulo FC players
Grêmio Foot-Ball Porto Alegrense players
Santos FC players
Cruzeiro Esporte Clube players
Associação Atlética Ponte Preta players
América Futebol Clube (MG) players
Campeonato Brasileiro Série A players
J2 League players
Expatriate footballers in Japan
Brazil international footballers